Face the Music is the seventh studio album by American singer Avant. Released on February 1, 2013 in the United States, it marked his debut released on his own label Mo-B Entertainment. Distribution was overseen by Caroline Distribution and EMI Records. The album features collaborations with J'Lyn, Kriss "Kajun" Johnson and singer Keke Wyatt. As of August  2015, Face the Music has sold over 77,000 copies in the United States.

Critical reception

Andy Kellman from Allmusic rated the album three stars out of five. He wrote that Face the Music is "another set of sophisticated, adult-oriented R&B that occasionally veers into boilerplate belligerence without quite reaching "Break Ya Back" territory [...] Altogether, it's a pleasing, natural continuation, full of slow grooves that tend to be convincingly romantic."

Singles
"You & I" featuring American R&B singer Keke Wyatt was released as the album's lead single in August, 2012. The song impacted urban radio in September, 2012. On December 1, 2012, the song peaked at number 46 on Billboard's Hot R&B/Hip-Hop Songs chart. The music video for "You & I" was released on Avant's YouTube channel on January 4, 2013. The song debuted on Billboard's Adult R&B Songs Chart at number 23 later rising to number 1 on March 2, 2013 in its twenty third week. The song spent 41 weeks in the top 20 on the Adult R&B Songs Chart before leaving the chart on July 6, 2013.

"More" was released as the album's second single on June, 2013. The song peaked at number 16 on Billboard's Adult R&B Songs Chart on September 21, 2013. The song spent 23 weeks in the top 20 chart before leaving the Adult R&B Songs Chart on September 28, 2013.

Commercial performance
In the United States, Face the Music debuted at number 40 on the Billboard 200, number 4 on the R&B Albums and at number 9 on the Top R&B/Hip-Hop Albums, selling 14,000 copies in the first week.

Track listing

Notes
 denotes co-producer
 denotes vocals producer

Credits and personnel
Album credits taken from Allmusic.

 Performers and musicians

Avant – Vocals, Background
J'Lyn – Vocals (track 2)
Kriss "Kajun" Johnson – Vocals (track 2)
Keke Wyatt – Vocals, Background (track 7)

 Technical personnel

Avant – Executive Producer, Producer, Vocal Producer
Andre "Dre Hen" Henry – Composer, Producer
Kriss "Kajun" Johnson – Composer, Producer, Executive Producer, Vocal Producer
Tabetha Plummer – Executive Producer
Jerry Woodard – Executive Producer
Tim & Bob – Composer, Producer
Peter Mokran – Mixing Engineer
Eric Weever – Mixing Assistant
Shah Wonders – Design

Charts

Weekly charts

Year-end charts

Release history

References

2013 albums
Avant albums
Albums produced by Tim & Bob